Tun Hussein bin Dato' Onn (12 February 1922 – 29 May 1990) was a Malaysian lawyer and politician who served as the 3rd Prime Minister of Malaysia from the death of his predecessor Abdul Razak Hussein in January 1976 to his retirement in July 1981. He was granted the soubriquet Father of Unity (Bapa Perpaduan).

Family 
Hussein bin Onn was born on 12 February 1922 in Johor Bahru to Onn Jaafar (1895–1962) and Halimah Hussein (1899–1988). His father was a fighter for Malaysian independence and co-founder of the United Malays National Organisation (UMNO). Hussein's grandfather, Jaafar Haji Muhammad, was the first Menteri Besar of Johor while his grandmother, Rogayah Hanim, came from the Caucasus region of Ottoman Empire. She was likely presented as a concubine (see Circassian beauties) by the Ottoman court to the Sultan of Johor.

Additionally, Hussein was the brother-in-law of Abdul Razak Hussein, his predecessor as prime minister, for whom Hussein wed Suhailah Noah, a daughter of first Speaker of the Dewan Rakyat Mohamed Noah Omar, in 1948. Abdul Razak married another Mohamed Noah's daughter, Rahah Noah.

Hussein and Suhaila had six children, including their fourth child, Hishammuddin Hussein, who is a senior UMNO politician since the 1990s. Their eldest daughter, Datin Roquaiya Hanim (born 1949), died on 17 September 2005 from breast cancer.

Early education and career 
Hussein received his early education at Telok Kurau Primary School, Singapore, and at the English College Johore Bahru. After leaving school, he joined the Johor Military Forces as a cadet in 1940 and was sent a year later to the Indian Military Academy in Dehradun, India. Upon completion of his training, he was absorbed into the Indian Army and served in the Middle East when the Second World War broke out. His vast experience prompted the British to employ him as an instructor at the Malayan Police Recruiting and Training Centre in Rawalpindi.

Hussein came back to Malaya in 1945 and was appointed Commandant of the Johor Bahru Police Depot. The following year, he joined the Malaya Civil Service as an assistant administrative officer in Segamat, Johor. He was later posted to the state of Selangor, becoming Klang and Kuala Selangor's district officer.

Entering politics 
Hussein, who came from a family with a deep nationalistic spirit and political roots, resigned from the civil service to go into politics. In 1949, he became the first youth chief of UMNO, a party his father helped establish. In 1950, he was elected UMNO secretary general. Hussein, however, left UMNO in 1951 to join his father in forming the Independence of Malaya Party (IMP).

With IMP losing momentum, Hussein went to London to study law and was called to the Bar and admitted as a member of the Honourable Society of Lincoln's Inn, qualifying as a Barrister-at-Law. He came back as a certified lawyer and practised in Kuala Lumpur.

Rise to prominence 
Hussein returned to politics by rejoining UMNO in 1968, persuaded to do so by then-Deputy Prime Minister Abdul Razak Hussein. He stood and won the general elections in 1969 and was appointed as the Education Minister. Hussein's meteoric rise continued on 13 August 1973, when he took over as Deputy Prime Minister, succeeding Ismail Abdul Rahman, who died in office due to a heart attack.

Premiership 
On 15 January 1976, Hussein, who was the Deputy Prime Minister, was appointed as Prime Minister after the death of his predecessor, Abdul Razak.

Hussein was renowned for stressing the issue of unity through policies aimed at rectifying economic imbalances between the various communities found in Malaysia. For instance, on 20 April 1981, the National Unit Trust Scheme was launched. He also gave serious consideration to the concept of Rukun Tetangga (a neighbourhood watch scheme) and the fight against the drug menace.

Hussein underwent a coronary bypass in early 1981. On 17 July, the same year, he retired from active politics and resigned from the office of prime minister due to health concerns. He was succeeded by his deputy, Mahathir Mohamad.

Post-retirement 
After his retirement from politics, Hussein continued to contribute to welfare organisations. He was instrumental in the setting up of the Tun Hussein Onn Eye Hospital. He was also an advisor to PETRONAS, the country's oil company, and chairman of the Institute of Strategic and International Studies (ISIS).

Death 
Hussein died on 29 May 1990 of heart disease at Seton Medical Center in South San Francisco, California, at the age of 68. He was buried next to his predecessor, Abdul Razak, at Makam Pahlawan near Masjid Negara, Kuala Lumpur.

Awards and recognitions

Honours of Malaysia
  :
  Grand Commander of the Order of the Defender of the Realm (SMN) – Tun (1981)
  :
  First Class of the Sultan Ibrahim Medal (PIS I) 
  Knight Grand Commander of the Order of the Crown of Johor (SPMJ) – Dato' (1972)
  Knight Grand Companion of the Order of Loyalty of Sultan Ismail of Johor (SSIJ) – Dato' (1975)
  Grand Commander of the Royal Family Order of Johor (DK I) (1976)
  : 
  Second Class Member of the Royal Family Order of Selangor (DK II) (1977)
  :
  Member First Class of the Family Order of Terengganu (DK I) (1977)
  :
  Recipient of the Royal Family Order of Kelantan (DK)
  : 
  Grand Knight of the Order of Cura Si Manja Kini (SPCM) – Dato' Seri (1976)
  : 
  Knight Grand Commander of the Order of Loyalty to Negeri Sembilan (SPNS) – Dato' Seri Utama (1980)
  :
  Grand Knight of the Order of the Crown of Pahang (SIMP) – formerly Dato', now Dato' Indera (1975)
  :
  Grand Commander of the Order of Kinabalu (SPDK) – Datuk Seri Panglima (1974)
  :
  Knight Grand Commander of the Order of the Star of Hornbill Sarawak (DP) – Datuk Patinggi
  :
  Knight Grand Commander of the Order of the Defender of State (DUPN) – Dato' Seri Utama

Places named after him
Several places were named after him, including:
 Bandar Tun Hussein Onn, a township in Cheras, Hulu Langat, Selangor
  Bandar Tun Hussein Onn MRT station
 Desa Tun Hussein Onn, a Malaysian Armed Forces residential area near Setiawangsa, Kuala Lumpur
 Tun Hussein Onn Jamek Mosque, a mosque in Larkin, Johor, Johor

 Tun Hussein Onn University of Malaysia (UTHM) Batu Pahat, Johor
 Institut Pendidikan Tun Hussein Onn (IPTHO) Batu Pahat, Johor
 Kolej Tun Hussein Onn, a residential college at Universiti Kebangsaan Malaysia, Bangi, Selangor
 Kolej Tun Hussein Onn, a residential college at Universiti Teknologi Malaysia, Skudai, Johor
 Kolej Tun Hussein Onn, a residential college at Universiti Malaysia Perlis, Kuala Perlis, Perlis
 Kolej Tun Hussein Onn, a residential college at Universiti Teknologi MARA, Machang, Kelantan
 SMK Tun Hussein Onn (SMKTHO), a secondary school in Kluang, Johor 
 SMK Tun Hussein Onn (SMKTHO), a secondary school in Seberang Jaya, Penang
 SK Tun Hussein Onn (SKTHO), a primary school in Kampung Pandan, Kuala Lumpur
 Tun Hussein Onn National Eye Hospital, Petaling Jaya, Selangor
 Tun Hussein Onn Highway, part of the Penang Bridge, Penang
 Jalan Tun Hussein Onn, a major road in Putrajaya
 Jalan Tun Hussein Onn, a road in Seberang Jaya, Penang

 Jalan Tun Hussein, a road in Felda Ayer Tawar, Kota Tinggi, Johor
 Jalan Tun Hussein Onn, a road in Taman Tinggi, Sibu, Sarawak
 Tun Hussein Onn Hockey Cup
 Dewan Tun Hussein Onn, Putra World Trade Centre
 Tun Hussein Onn Memorial, a memorial in Kuala Lumpur
 SMK Desa Tun Hussein Onn (SMKDTHO), a secondary school in Desa Tun Hussein Onn, Kuala Lumpur
 SK Desa Tun Hussein Onn (SKDTHO), a primary school in Desa Tun Hussein Onn, Kuala Lumpur

Notes and references

Government ministers of Malaysia
Prime Ministers of Malaysia
1922 births
1990 deaths
Deputy Prime Ministers of Malaysia
20th-century Malaysian lawyers
Members of Lincoln's Inn
Malaysian military personnel
Malaysian Muslims
Malaysian people of Circassian descent
Malaysian people of Malay descent
Malaysian people of Turkish descent
Hussein Onn
Members of the Dewan Rakyat
Presidents of United Malays National Organisation
Grand Commanders of the Order of the Defender of the Realm
First Classes of the Royal Family Order of Johor
First Classes of the Family Order of Terengganu
Second Classes of Royal Family Order of Selangor
Knights Grand Commander of the Order of the Crown of Johor
Grand Commanders of the Order of Kinabalu
Knights Grand Commander of the Order of the Star of Hornbill Sarawak
20th-century Malaysian politicians
Defence ministers of Malaysia
Education ministers of Malaysia
Finance ministers of Malaysia